Heathen Chemistry is the fifth studio album by English rock band Oasis. It was released on 1 July 2002 by Big Brother Recordings. It is the first Oasis studio album recorded with guitarist Gem Archer and bassist Andy Bell, who both joined the band after work on previous album Standing on the Shoulder of Giants had been completed. It is the last album to feature longtime drummer, Alan White, who left in early 2004, with Noel Gallagher claiming White's commitment to the band was not adequate.

Recording
Heathen Chemistry was recorded during 2001–early 2002 and is the first Oasis album to have significant writing contributions from members other than chief songwriter Noel Gallagher. Front man Liam Gallagher contributed three songs, and new bassist Andy Bell and rhythm guitarist Gem Archer contributed one song each as well.

Although most of the song's instrumentation was complete by mid-to-late 2001, Noel indicated that the release date of the album was being needlessly delayed by Liam's apparent reluctance to lay down his vocal parts at recording sessions, and went on to state that he was "livid" at the lack of work being done:

I was really happy with (the album) until recently, but I'm fucking livid now. I finished my bits three-and-a-half months ago, and then we handed it over to Liam, and in three-and-a-half months he's done nothing. Just concentrated on his drinking habit again. It's just drifting at the moment.

All the backing tracks are done and it's a fantastic album of instrumentals. Hand it over to the singer and it just slows down and becomes this one really long, drawn-out, painful process. So, to be honest with you, I don't know when it'll come out now. It's down to him.

Despite the setbacks during the recording process, when the album was finally complete Noel was confident that it was the group's second best album to date, behind their debut Definitely Maybe.

The title of the album, according to Noel, came from a T-shirt he bought in Ibiza which featured a logo reading, "The Society of Heathen Chemists". Similarly, the name of the first single, "The Hindu Times", originated from a logo on a T-shirt that read the same thing, which Noel saw during a photo shoot for GQ's 100 Greatest Guitarists edition. The name was given to the track when it was just an instrumental and the name stuck once the track was finished.

Release
The release of the album was overshadowed by an Internet leak of all 11 songs almost three months prior to release, which was evident at a Las Vegas show the group performed where fans knew the words to several new songs before the album's release. However, listeners of the commercially released album heard slight differences to two tracks, "Little by Little" and "Better Man".

The length of track 11, "Better Man" is 38:03; this is because of a hidden track called "The Cage", which begins after 30 minutes of silence. In the Japanese and digital versions, "Better Man" and the hidden track "The Cage" were separated and the 30-minute silence was removed.

The album was certified triple platinum in UK, and 154,000 copies in the US. Upon release, Heathen Chemistry went straight to number one in the UK, though it fared rather poorly in the US, only entering at number 23.

It spawned four singles, each of which made the top three in the UK charts: "The Hindu Times", their sixth number one single in the UK; "Stop Crying Your Heart Out"; "Little By Little/She Is Love", the double A-side sung by Noel Gallagher; and "Songbird", the first single written by Liam.

Reception

Reception for the album varied wildly. On Metacritic it had a score of 55 out of 100 based on reviews from 22 critics, indicating "mixed or average reviews". Some reviewers noted that it was better than the band's last effort, Standing on the Shoulder of Giants, with Blender writing that Oasis was "a band back on track". However, a number of other reviewers offered scathing assessments of the album; notably, Drowned in Sound, Pitchfork, and Stylus Magazine.

In 2017, Liam Gallagher ranked Heathen Chemistry as his least favourite Oasis album.

Track listing

 Notes
In the Japanese and digital versions, "Better Man" and the hidden track "The Cage" were separated and the 30-minute silence was removed.

Personnel

Oasis
 Liam Gallagher – vocals, tambourine , acoustic guitar
 Noel Gallagher – guitar, keyboards, backing vocals, lead vocals on tracks 2, 6, 9, 13, drums on track 11
 Gem Archer – guitar, keyboards, backing vocals
 Andy Bell – bass guitar
 Alan White – drums, percussion

Additional musicians
 Paul Stacey – mellotron on track 1, piano on tracks 2–3 and 11, Hammond organ on track 6
 Mike Rowe – piano on tracks 4 and 10, pump organ on track 9, Hammond organ on tracks 8–10
 Johnny Marr – guitar solo on track 8, slide guitar on track 10, guitar and backing vocals on track 11
 London Session Orchestra – strings on track 4

Charts

Weekly charts

Year-end charts

Certifications and sales

References

External links

 Heathen Chemistry at YouTube (streamed copy where licensed)

2002 albums
Big Brother Recordings albums
Oasis (band) albums
Epic Records albums
Albums recorded at Wheeler End Studios
Albums recorded at Olympic Sound Studios